The Umbrian regional election of 1980 took place on 8 June 1980.

Events
The Italian Communist Party was by far the largest party, gaining almost twice the votes of Christian Democracy. After the election, Germano Marri, the incumbent Communist President, continued to govern the Region at the head of a left-wing coalition with the Italian Socialist Party (Popular Democratic Front).

Results

Source: Ministry of the Interior

Elections in Umbria
1980 elections in Italy